Prev List of Vanity Fair (British magazine) caricatures (1910–1914)

 
1910s in the United Kingdom